Yúber Antonio Mosquera Perea  or simply Yúber Mosquera (born August 31, 1984 in Medellín) is a Colombian professional football player. Currently, he plays for Universidad Católica in the Ecuadorian Serie A.

References

1984 births
Living people
Colombian footballers
Footballers from Medellín
Envigado F.C. players
Leones F.C. footballers
Asociación Civil Deportivo Lara players
Deportivo Táchira F.C. players
Venezuelan Primera División players
C.D. Universidad Católica del Ecuador footballers
Ecuadorian Serie A players
Colombian expatriate footballers
Colombian expatriate sportspeople in Venezuela
Colombian expatriate sportspeople in Ecuador
Expatriate footballers in Venezuela
Expatriate footballers in Ecuador
Association football defenders